Arnold Halbach (3 July 1787 in Müngsten, near Remscheid – 16 May 1869 in Baden-Baden) was the Prussian Consul in Philadelphia.

He was the son of Johann Arnold Halbach and in 1810, he founded a steel plant in the US, to supply steel for the local manufacturers of gun barrels.  In 1828, the firm "Johann and Caspar Halbach and sons" had to close the plant.

From 1828 to 1838, he was the Prussian consul in Philadelphia.  From 1840, he lived in Baden-Baden with his wife Johanna Karoline Mathilde Bohlen (1800-1882). Their daughter Matilde Halbach (1822-1844) was the mother of Karoline of Wartensleben and a great-great-grandmother of Queen Beatrix of the Netherlands.  Their son Gustav von Bohlen und Halbach (1831-1890) and grandson Gustav Krupp von Bohlen und Halbach (1870-1950) also had a career in the diplomatic service.

External links 
 The Baden side of the steel-dynasty Krupp, in: Momente, 1/2005

19th-century German businesspeople
1787 births
1869 deaths